List of books about the Troubles are works of literature cited using APA style citations.

Non-fiction
 Baldy, F. Tom (1997). The Battle for Ulster: A Study of Internal Security. Diane Publishing. 
 Bell, J. Bowyer (1993). The Irish Troubles: A Generation of Violence 1967–1992. St. Martin's Press. .
 Beresford, David (1989). Ten Men Dead: The Story of the 1981 Irish Hunger Strike. Atlantic Monthly Press. 
 
 Bourke, Richard (2003). Peace In Ireland: The War of Ideas (Random House).
 
 Collins, Eamon and Mick McGovern (1999). Killing rage. London: Granta. .
 Curtis, Liz (1984). Ireland: The Propaganda War. The British Media and the Battle for Hearts and Minds. London: Pluto.
 Dillon, Martin (1989). The Shankill Butchers: A Case History of Mass Murder. London: Hutcheson.
 Edwards, Ruth (2000). The Faithful Tribe: An Intimate Portrait of the Loyal Institutions. HarperCollins. 
 
 Grant, Patrick (1999). Breaking Enmities: Religion, Literature and Culture in Northern Ireland, 1967–97. New York: St Martin's Press. 
 Grant, Patrick (2001) Literature, Rhetoric, and Violence in Northern Ireland, 1968–1998: Hardened to Death. New York: Palgrave. 
 Harnden, Toby (2000). Bandit Country: The IRA and South Armagh. Coronet Books. 
 McGartland, Martin (1997). Fifty Dead Men Walking: The True Story of a British Secret Agent inside the IRA. Hastings House. 
 McKittrick, David, and David McVea (2012). Making Sense of the Troubles: The Story of the Conflict in Northern Ireland Viking. 
 McKittrick, David (2001). Lost Lives: The Stories of the Men, Women and Children who Died as a Result of the Northern Ireland Troubles. Mainstream Publishing. 
 McKittrick, David et al. (1996). The Fight for Peace: The Secret Story Behind the Irish Peace Process. 
 Miller, David (1994). Don't Mention the War. Northern Ireland, Propaganda and the Media. London: Pluto.
 Myers, Kevin (2006). Watching the Door: Drinking Up, Getting Down, and Cheating Death in 1970s Belfast. Soft Skull Press. 
 
 O'Callaghan, Sean (1998). The Informer: The Real Life Story of One Man's War Against Terrorism. Bantam Books, .
 Rolston, Bill (ed.) (1991). The Media and Northern Ireland: Covering the Troubles. Macmillan Academic and Professional Ltd. 
 Schlesinger, Philip et al. (1983). Televising Terrorism: Political Violence in Popular Culture. London: Comedia.
 Seymour, Gerald (1992). The Journeyman Tailor. HarperCollins. 
 Sharrock, David, et al. (1998). Man of War, Man of Peace: The Unauthorised Biography of Gerry Adams. Pan Books. 
 Stevenson, Jonathan (1996). "We Wrecked the Place": Contemplating an End to the Northern Irish Troubles. Free Press. .
 Taylor, Peter (1998). Provos: The IRA and Sinn Féin. Bloomsbury. .
 Taylor, Peter (1999). Loyalists: War and Peace in Northern Ireland. Bloomsbury. .
 Taylor, Peter (2000). Brits: The War Against the IRA. Bloomsbury. .
 Toolis, Kevin (1995). Rebel Hearts: Journeys within the IRA's Soul. Picador. .

Fiction 
 Brandner, Cindy. (2001). Exit Unicorns Series:
 (2001). Exit Unicorns.
(2007). Mermaid in a Bowl of Tears. 
 (2012). Flights of Angels. 
 (2013). Spindrift. 
 (2016). In the Country of Shadows.
 (2018). Bare Knuckle. 
Burns, Anna (2018). Milkman.
 Hughes, Michael (2018). Country. 
 MacLaverty, Bernard (1988). Cal. Heinemann. 
 McKinty, Adrian. Sean Duffy Series: 
 (2012). The Cold Cold Ground. Serpents Tail. 
 (2013). I Hear the Sirens in the Street. Serpents Tail. 
 (2014). In the Morning I'll Be Gone. Serpents Tail. 
 (2015). Gun Street Girl. Serpents Tail. 
 (2016). Rain Dogs. Serpents Tail. 
 McNicholl, Damian (2004). A Son Called Gabriel. 
 Patterson, Glenn (1999). The International.
 Uris, Leon (1995). Trinity. Doubleday. 
 Watts, Lee (2015). A Stone's Throw. 
 J. P. Hidcote. The Gortin Paradox. Paperback ; ebook

See also

Directory of the Northern Ireland Troubles
List of bombings during the Northern Ireland Troubles and peace process
Timeline of the Northern Ireland Troubles and peace process

References

Troubles
The Troubles (Northern Ireland)-related lists